Manjung City Football Club is a Malaysian professional football club based in Manjung, Perak. They currently play in the second division of Malaysian football, the Malaysia M3 League.

History
Founded in 2013, Puchong Fuerza made its debut into Malaysian football by joining the fifth-tier Malaysia M5 League in 2018.
 
In 2019, Puchong Fuerza competed in the Malaysia FA Cup for the first time in the club's history.

Starting from 2020 season, the team has been rebranded to Manjung City Football Club and relocated to Manjung, Perak.

Crest and colours
Manjung City has utilised one primary crest, before the club introduced a new crest starting in 2020 season, in order to solidify its new branding.

Players

First-team squad

 

(captain)

Management team

Coaching staff

Season by season record

Notes:   2020 Season cancelled due to the COVID-19 pandemic, no promotion or league title was awarded.

Honours
Domestic competitions
LeaguePuchong Community League  Winners (1) : 2018

CupSelangor Champions League  Winners (1)' : 2018

References

Malaysia M3 League
Football clubs in Malaysia
Sport in Selangor